The 2012–13 FC Arsenal Kyiv season was the club's 18th Ukrainian Premier League season and second season under manager Leonid Kuchuk. During the season, Arsenal Kyiv competed in the Premier League, UEFA Europa League and Ukrainian Cup.

Squad

Out on loan

Competitions

2012-13 Ukrainian Premier League

Results summary

Results by round

Results

League table

2012-13 Ukrainian Cup Results

UEFA Europa League

Third qualifying round

Notes
Note 1: UEFA awarded Mura 05 a 3–0 win due to Arsenal Kyiv fielding suspended player Éric Matoukou in the first leg. The original match had ended in a 3–0 win for Arsenal Kyiv.

Squad statistics

Goal scorers

Appearances and goals

|-
|colspan="14"|Players who appeared for Arsenal who left the club during the season:

|}

Disciplinary record

References

Arsenal Kyiv
FC Arsenal Kyiv seasons